Mehregan or Jashn-e Mehr (  Mithra Festival) is a Zoroastrian and Iranian festival celebrated to honor the yazata Mithra, which is responsible for friendship, affection and love.

Name 
"Mehregan" is derived from the Middle Persian name Mihrakān/Mihragān, itself derived from Old Persian Mithrakāna.

Introduction
Mehregan is an Iranian festival honoring the Zoroastrian yazata (angelic divinity) Mithra. Under the Achaemenid Empire (330–550 BC), the Armenian subjects of the Persian king gave him 20,000 horses every year during the celebration of Mehregan. Under the Sasanian Empire (224–651), Mehregan was the second most important festival, falling behind Nowruz. Due to these two festivals being heavily connected with the role of Iranian kingship, the Sasanian rulers were usually crowned on either Mehregan or Nowruz.

By the 4th century BCE, it was observed as one of the name-day feasts, a form it retains in today. Still, in a predominantly Muslim Iran, it is one of the two pre-Islamic festivals that continue to be celebrated by the public at large: Mehrgān, dedicated to Mithra (modern Mehr), and Tirgan, dedicated to Tishtrya (modern Tir).

Name-day feasts are festivals celebrated on the day of the year when the day-name and month-name dedicated to a particular divinity intersect. The Mehr day in the Mehr month corresponded to the day farmers harvested their crops. They thus also celebrated the fact Ahura Mazda had given them food to survive the coming cold months.

Irrespective of which calendar is observed, Mehrgān falls on the 196th day of the calendar year. For details on how this date is calculated, see basis for the date, below. For calendars that have March 21 as Nowruz or New Year's Day (i.e. in the Fasili and Bastani variants of the Zoroastrian calendar as well as in the Iranian civil calendar), Mehrgān falls on October 2 but according to Jalali calendar Mehregan falls on October 8. For the Shahanshahi variant of the Zoroastrian calendar, which in 2006–2007 has New Year's Day on August 20, Mehrgān fell on March 3 of the following Gregorian year. For the Kadmi variant, which has New Year's Day 30 days earlier, Mehrgān falls on February 1.

In al-Biruni's eleventh-century Book of Instructions in the Elements of the Art of Astrology (233), the astronomer observed that "some people have given the preference to Mihragān [over Nowruz, i.e. New Year's day/Spring Equinox] by as much as they prefer autumn to spring."

As Biruni also does for the other festival days he mentions, he reiterates a local anecdotal association for his description of Mehrgan (ha al-mirjan in the author's Arabic parlance) with a fragment of a tale from Iranian folklore: On this day, Fereydun vanquished the evil Zahhak and confined him to Mount Damavand. This fragment of the legend is part of a greater cycle that ties Mehrgan with Nowruz; Dahak vanquished Jamshid (who the legends have as the one establishing Nowruz or New Year's Day), and Fereydun vanquishes Zahhak, so restoring the balance. The association of Mehrgan with the polarity of spring/autumn, sowing/harvest and the birth/rebirth cycle did not escape Biruni either, for as he noted, "they consider Mihragān as a sign of resurrection and the end of the world, because at Mihragān that which grows reaches perfection."

In ancient times

Mehrgān was celebrated in an extravagant style at Persepolis. Not only was it the time for harvest, but it was also the time when the taxes were collected. Visitors from different parts of the Persian Empire brought gifts for the king all contributing to a lively festival.

During pre-Islamic and early Islamic Iran, Mehrgān was celebrated with the same magnificence and pageantry as Nowruz. It was customary for people to send or give their king, and each other, gifts. Rich people usually gave gold and silver coins, heroes and warriors gave horses while others gave gifts according to their financial power and ability, even as simple as an apple. Those fortunate enough would help the poor with gifts.

Gifts to the royal court of over ten thousand gold coins were registered. If the gift-giver needed money at a later time, the court would then return twice the gift amount. Kings gave two audiences a year: one audience at Nowruz and other at Mehregān. During the Mehregān celebrations, the king wore a fur robe and gave away all his summer clothes.

After the Mongol invasion of Iran, the feast celebration of Mehrgān lost its popularity. Zoroastrians of Yazd and Kermān continued to celebrate Mehrgān in an extravagant way.

In the present-day
For this celebration, the participants wear new clothes and set a decorative, colorful table. The sides of the tablecloth are decorated with dry marjoram. A copy of the Khordeh Avesta ("little Avesta"), a mirror and a sormeh-dan (a traditional eyeliner or kohl) are placed on the table together with rosewater, sweets, flowers, vegetables and fruits, especially pomegranates and apples, and nuts such as almonds or pistachios. A few silver coins and lotus seeds are placed in a dish of water scented with marjoram extract.

A burner is also part of the table setting for kondor/loban (frankincense) and espand (seeds of Peganum harmala, Syrian rue) to be thrown on the flames.

At lunch time when the ceremony begins, everyone in the family stands in front of the mirror to pray. Sharbat is drunk and then—as a good omen—sormeh is applied around the eyes. Handfuls of wild marjoram, lotus and sugar plum seeds are thrown over one another's heads while they embrace one another.

In 1960s the Postal Service in Tehran issued a series of stamps to commemorate Mehrgan Festival.

On October 2, 2022, which was coincided with Mehregan, there were series of ceremonies conducted across Iran. These ceremonies were involved in the provinces of Tehran, Yazd, Kordestan, West Azerbaijan, Zanjan, Sistan and Baluchestan, Isfahan, Bushehr, North Khorasan, and Golestan.

Basis for the date
As noted above, Mehrgān is a name-day feast. These name-day feasts are festivals celebrated on the day of the year when the day-name and month-name dedicated to a particular angel or virtue intersect. Indeed, Zoroastrian Persians before Islam had 30-days months, which means that each day in a month had a different name, with 12 of the days also being names of the 12 months. The day whose name corresponded to the name of the month was celebrated. It was a celebration of life, seasons changing, God, and joy. In Zoroastrianism, happiness is very important and is considered as a holy virtue that must be attracted. Thus, this religion has always had many feasts and celebrations.

What that day corresponds to in another calendar is subject to which variant of the Zoroastrian calendar is followed:
The Fasili and Bastani variants of the religious calendar adhere to Gregorian intercalation (leap-day) rules, and therefore Mehregān is celebrated on a day that is fixed in relation to the Gregorian calendar. Mehrgān is then always on October 8.
The Shahanshahi and Kadmi variants of the religious calendar do not intercalate at all, with the result that over the last 14 centuries, Mehrgān has fallen behind and is now either 7th (Shahenshahi) or 8th (Kadmi) months before the same date in the Fasili and Bastani variants.

The Bastani calendar is used primarily in Greater Iran and by Persians of the diaspora, while Zoroastrians of India (subject to calendrical faction) use one of the other three variants.

Non-Zoroastrian Iranians do not observe any variant of the Zoroastrian calendar, but instead use Iranian calendars. When introduced in 1925, the Zoroastrian festival days were pegged to the Bastani variant of the Zoroastrian calendar. The first six months of the civil calendar had 31 days each, while all Zoroastrian calendar months have 30 days each. So by the 7th month (Mehr) there is a difference of 6 days between the two. Thus, October 8, which in the Bastani/Fasili calendar is the 16th day of Mehr month, is in the Persian civil calendar the 10th day (Aban) of Mehr.For this reason, Mobad Kourosh Niknam, the well-known Zoroastrian mobad in his website, in the article of " reviewing and harmonizing the traditional Zoroastrian calendar", believes that in order to avoid this confusion of the calendar, it is better for Zoroastrians to follow the Iranian calendar as well. Reza Moradi Ghiasabadi, an Iranian archaeoastronomer and post-colonial archaeological researcher in his website, in different articles, says : Because Iranian celebrations are based on natural events, Iranian celebrations should be held in accordance with the Iranian calendar, which is unique in chronological accuracy.

The relationship between Mehregān and the various calendars is perhaps better understood relative to Nowruz. When (relative to another calendar) the first day of the year occurs is subject to interpretation, but independent of when it occurs, Mehregān is celebrated 195 days after that, that is on the 196th day of the year.

See also
List of festivals in Iran
Zoroastrian festivals

References

Sources
 
 
 
 
 
 
 
 
 
 

Festivals in Iran
Iranian culture
October observances
Persian words and phrases
Zoroastrian festivals
Observances set by the Solar Hijri calendar
Autumn events in Iran